Andrew Yang (born January 13, 1975) is an American businessman, attorney, lobbyist, and politician. Yang was a candidate in the 2020 Democratic Party presidential primaries and the 2021 New York City Democratic mayoral primary. He is the co-chair of the Forward Party, alongside former New Jersey Governor Christine Todd Whitman.

The son of Taiwanese immigrants, Yang was born and raised in New York State. He attended Brown University and Columbia Law School. Yang became a prominent candidate in the 2020 Democratic Party presidential primaries. His signature policy was a universal basic income (UBI) of $1,000 a month as a response to job displacement by automation. Yang has been credited with popularizing the idea of universal basic income through his candidacy and activism.

News outlets described Yang as the most surprising candidate of the 2020 election cycle, going from a relative unknown to a major competitor in the race. Yang qualified for and participated in seven of the first eight Democratic debates. His supporters, informally known as the "Yang Gang", included several high-profile celebrities. Yang suspended his campaign on February 11, 2020, shortly after the New Hampshire primary. After his campaign ended, Yang joined CNN as a political commentator, announced the creation of the political nonprofit organization Humanity Forward, and ran in the 2021 New York City Democratic mayoral primary. Yang conceded the race shortly after the initial ranked choice votes were released, which placed him fourth.

On October 4, 2021, Andrew Yang announced that he was leaving the Democratic Party to become an independent, faulting what he characterized as a system stuck in increasing polarization and saying that he is "more comfortable trying to fix the system than being a part of it". Later in October 2021, Yang founded the Forward Party – a centrist political action committee and political party.

Early life and education 

Andrew Yang was born on January 13, 1975, in Schenectady, New York. His parents emigrated from Taiwan to the U.S. in the 1960s and met in graduate school at the University of California, Berkeley. Yang is of Hoklo Taiwanese descent. His father graduated with a Ph.D. in physics and worked in the research labs of IBM and General Electric, generating over 50 patents in his career. His mother graduated with a master's degree in statistics before becoming a systems administrator at a university, and later an artist. Yang has an older brother, Lawrence, who is a psychology professor at New York University.

Yang grew up in Somers in Westchester County, New York. He has described being bullied and called racial slurs by classmates while attending public school, in part because he was one of the smaller children in his class after skipping a grade. He attended Phillips Exeter Academy, a boarding school in New Hampshire. Yang was part of the 1992 U.S. national debate team, which competed at the world championships in London. After graduating from Exeter in 1992, he enrolled at Brown University, where he majored in economics and political science, graduating in 1996. He then attended Columbia Law School, earning a Juris Doctor in 1999.

Business career

Early career 
After graduating from law school, Yang began his career as a corporate attorney at Davis Polk & Wardwell in New York City. Yang later described the job as "a pie-eating contest, and if you won, your prize was more pie". He left the law firm after five months, which he has called "the five worst months of my life".

In February 2000, Yang joined his office mate, Jonathan Philips, in launching Stargiving, a website for celebrity-affiliated philanthropic fundraising. The startup had some initial success, but folded in 2002 as the dot-com bubble burst. Yang became involved in other ventures, including a party-organizing business. From 2002 to 2005, he served as the vice president of a healthcare startup.

Manhattan Prep 
After working in the healthcare industry for four years, Yang left MMF Systems to join his friend Zeke Vanderhoek at a small test preparation company, Manhattan Prep. In 2006, Vanderhoek asked Yang to take over as CEO. While Yang was CEO, the company primarily provided GMAT test preparation. It expanded from five to 69 locations and was acquired by Kaplan, Inc. in December 2009. Yang resigned as the company's president in early 2012. Yang later said it was during his time at Manhattan Prep that he became a millionaire.

In September 2019 testimony before the New York City Commission on Gender Equity, former employee Kimberly Watkins testified that Yang had fired her because he felt that she would not work as hard after getting married. Yang has denied the allegations. In an appearance on The View, Yang said, "I've had so many phenomenal women leaders that have elevated me and my organizations at every phase of my career, and if I was that kind of person I would never have had any success."

In November, a former employee of Yang's at Manhattan GMAT filed a lawsuit against him for allegedly paying her less than her male co-workers and subsequently firing her for asking for a raise. Yang and another female employee at the company disputed the anonymous woman's claim that she was in an equivalent position to the male co-workers she cited.

Venture for America 

Following Kaplan's acquisition of Manhattan Prep in late 2009, Yang began to work on creating a new nonprofit fellowship program, Venture for America (VFA), which he founded in 2011. The organization was intended to find and train entrepreneurs to start businesses in economically stressed cities. VFA was launched with $200,000 and trained 40 graduates in 2012 and 69 in 2013. VFA added Columbus, Miami, San Antonio, and St. Louis in 2014, with a class of 106.

VFA quickly received national attention, including from the Obama administration. In 2011, Yang was recognized by "Champions of Change", a White House program that honored 500 people from every state for extraordinary work in their communities. In 2015, Yang was named a Presidential Ambassador for Global Entrepreneurship.

VFA has also been criticized for falling far short of its 100,000 job goal. An ABC News investigation found that VFA's own tally counted only 365 jobs created as of 2020 and of those The New York Times has found only 150 remain. Startup, a documentary film co-directed by Cynthia Wade and Cheryl Miller Houser about six startups in Detroit launched through VFA, was released in 2016. Yang stepped down from his position as CEO of VFA in March 2017 but continued to advise startups aligned with his signature policy of universal basic income during his presidential campaign.

Legendary Ventures 
On August 10, 2022, Andrew Yang joined the advisory team at Legendary Ventures, an early stage venture capital firm, to drive strategic value across the firm's portfolio of consumer retail technology investments, alongside Fung Brothers Ventures.

Humanity Forward 
On March 5, 2020, following the suspension of his presidential campaign, Yang announced that he was creating the nonprofit organization Humanity Forward Foundation, dedicated to promoting the ideas he campaigned on during his run, such as UBI, ranked voting, and data privacy. Yang also announced that the organization, together with The Spark of Hudson, forming HudsonUP, would give away $500,000 in UBI to the residents of Hudson, New York, to demonstrate UBI's benefits. After the Trump administration said it was considering a form of basic income in response to the pandemic, Yang announced that he had been in touch with the White House and had offered his team's services. 

On March 20, CNN reported that Humanity Forward would soon spend $1million on $1,000 monthly payments to 500 low-income households in the Bronx during the crisis. Yang tweeted that the number of households was expected to double with additional funding. On August 3, Yang announced that his organization was partnering with The $1K Project, an online network that helps identify families in need, who will be awarded three months of $1,000 payments. One of the network's founders describes the program as "a bridge to reemployment or other kinds of support."

Humanity Forward stated that it was not supporting or endorsing any candidate after Yang announced his run for mayor of New York City.

Lobby 3 
On February 17, 2022, Yang announced the launch of a Web3 community whose membership token fees would be used to fund lobbying work on behalf of Web3, blockchain, and cryptocurrency interests on Capitol Hill.  The announcement has been met with some criticism in part due to Yang's continued launches of organizations in addition to the skepticism around cryptocurrency ventures.

Net worth 
Media outlets have provided several estimates of Yang's net worth: $1 million according to Forbes, between $834,000 and $2.4 million according to The Wall Street Journal, and between $3 million and $4 million according to Newsweek. Several sources have also estimated it being as low as $584,047.

Political career

Work with the Obama administration 

In 2011, Yang was named a "Champion of Change" by the Obama administration. In 2015, he was selected as a Presidential Ambassador for Global Entrepreneurship.

2020 presidential campaign 

On November 6, 2017, Yang filed with the Federal Election Commission (FEC) to run for President of the United States in 2020. The campaign began with a small initial staff working out of an apartment owned by Yang's mother. He ran on multiple slogans, including "Humanity First", "Make America Think Harder (MATH)", and "Not Left, Not Right, Forward." Initially considered a longshot, Yang's campaign gained significant momentum in February 2019 following an appearance on the popular podcast The Joe Rogan Experience. He later appeared on other podcasts and shows, including The Breakfast Club, The Ben Shapiro Show, and Real Time with Bill Maher. By March 2019, Yang had met the polling and fundraising thresholds to qualify for the first round of Democratic primary debates. In August 2019, he met the higher thresholds to qualify for the second round of Democratic debates. Later, he qualified for the third, fourth, fifth, and sixth Democratic debates but was unable to meet a polling threshold for the January 2020 debate. He did qualify for the February 2020 debate.

Yang's campaign focused largely on policy, in what Reuters described as a "technocratic approach." Yang regularly called Donald Trump a symptom of a wider problem in the economy, rather than the problem itself. According to The New York Times, Yang was known for doing interviews with conservative news outlets, and "although [Yang] tweets often, he almost never tweets about Mr. Trump." This approach was exemplified by one of Yang's campaign slogans: "Not Left, Not Right, Forward."

Yang's campaign was known for its heavy reliance on Internet-based campaigning. The campaign was also known for its popularity online, with The New York Times calling Yang "The Internet's Favorite Candidate." His campaign supporters, known informally as the Yang Gang, brought attention to his campaign on Reddit, Facebook, Instagram, Twitter, and other social media platforms, through memes and viral campaigning. Several news outlets called Yang the most surprising candidate of the election cycle, going from relative obscurity to a national contender who outlasted several well-known politicians.

Yang also received several high profile endorsements, such as from Tesla CEO Elon Musk.

Yang was at least the third American of East Asian descent to run for President of the United States, after Hiram Fong and Patsy Mink. According to BBC, he was "one of the first and most recognizable East Asian-Americans in history to run for president." He has said that he hoped his "campaign can inspire Asian Americans to be engaged in [politics]."

Yang dropped out of the presidential race on February 11, 2020. On March 10, 2020, Yang endorsed Joe Biden.

Media coverage 

On multiple occasions, news media disproportionally omitted Yang from election coverage or presented misleading data about his standing in polls. Incidents include cases of news outlets excluding Yang from lists of 2020 Democratic candidates. On August 29, 2019, a CNN infographic displaying the results of a poll included candidate Beto O'Rourke but not Yang, even though the poll showed Yang polling three times higher than O'Rourke. Yang supporters criticized media outlets for the disproportionately low coverage, including via Twitter hashtag #YangMediaBlackout.

Post-campaign 
Yang dropped out of the presidential race on February 11, 2020, after a disappointing result in the New Hampshire primary. He announced to his supporters, "while we did not win this election, we are just getting started." Former Mayor Michael Bloomberg's counselor Howard Wolfson suggested that Yang "would make a very interesting candidate" for mayor of New York City; Yang said, "it's incredibly flattering to be thought of in that role.... We haven't ruled anything out at this point. I will say I'm more attracted to executive roles than legislative ones because I think you can get more done." On March 3, Yang reiterated his interest in the mayoralty to BuzzFeed News.

On February 19, Yang joined CNN as a political commentator. On March 10, the night of the Michigan Democratic primary, he endorsed Joe Biden. He said he understood Sanders' supporters' frustration, but that beating Trump was the most important objective.  After his campaign, Yang created a podcast, Yang Speaks, where he discussed national and global issues with guest commentators. The podcast has since been folded into his newest brand, "Forward". The podcast continues to publish new episodes weekly. 

On April 29, 2020, Yang announced that he was taking legal action against the New York State Board of Elections after the state election commission voted to cancel its presidential primary. The filing stated: "This unprecedented and unwarranted move infringes the rights of Plaintiffs and all New York State Democratic Party voters, of which there are estimated to be more than six million, as it fundamentally denies them the right to choose our next candidate for the office of President of the United States." In early May, the judge ruled in Yang's favor.

Initially left out of the list of confirmed speakers for the 2020 Democratic National Convention, Yang expressed his dissatisfaction on Twitter stating that he "kind of expected to speak" at the event. Yang spoke at the DNC on August 20, as the third speaker of the night.

In September 2020, the Biden campaign hired Yang as a member of its small business advisory council. In November 2020, Yang announced that he and his wife were moving to Atlanta to assist Raphael Warnock's and Jon Ossoff's campaigns in the January 2021 Georgia Senate runoff elections.

In August 2020, Yang revealed to The Carlos Watson Show that he had been in contact with Joe Biden's 2020 presidential campaign about a potential role in the Biden cabinet focusing on the issue of technology in society. In Yang's book Forward: Notes on the Future of Our Democracy, he writes that he interviewed with Biden's transition team for the role of United States Secretary of Labor. He also suggested that he serve in a new role, Secretary of Technology and Innovation.

2021 New York City mayoral campaign 

 

After the suspension of his presidential campaign in February 2020, Yang was considered a potential candidate in the 2021 New York City mayoral election to succeed the outgoing Bill de Blasio, with Yang himself expressing interest in seeking the office. Yang had reportedly told city leaders that he intended to run for mayor after polling obtained by the New York Post showed him leading the field, with 20% of New Yorkers saying they would support his candidacy. Yang filed paperwork to raise money for his mayoral campaign on December 23, 2020.

On January 8, 2021, Politico reported that Yang left New York City during the height of the COVID-19 pandemic to stay at his second home in New Paltz, New York. In an interview with The New York Times, he said, "Can you imagine trying to have two kids on virtual school in a two-bedroom apartment and then trying to do work yourself?" Critics saw his comments as tone-deaf, as many Americans had to balance work and family during COVID-19 lockdowns.

Yang formally announced his bid for mayor on January 13, 2021, on Twitter. He himself had not voted in a municipal election since 2001. Yang was endorsed by U.S. Representatives Grace Meng and Ritchie Torres, as well as a number of other New York state and city political figures. He emerged as a front-runner after entering the race, and maintained a steady lead in polls; starting in May 2021, Yang's lead shrank as Eric Adams emerged as another front-runner. After placing fourth in first-place votes on election night, June 22, Yang conceded that he could not win the race and ended his campaign.

Founding of the Forward Party 

In Yang's 2021 book Forward: Notes on the Future of Our Democracy, he announced his intention to found a new third party, the Forward Party. On October 4, 2021, Yang announced on his blog that he had changed his voter registration from Democrat to Independent, saying he was "confident that no longer being a Democrat is the right thing"; the next day he announced the formation of the Forward Party. 

Yang said the group would start as a social movement and political action committee, and eventually petition the FEC for formal recognition as a political party.  On July 27, 2022, the Forward Party announced a merger with the Serve America Movement and the Renew America Movement to form a new political party. The party is officially registered as a minor party in Nevada and legal party status in Maine and Texas.

Personal life 

Yang has been married to Evelyn Yang since 2011; the couple have two sons. He has spoken about his older son Christopher, who is autistic, saying: "I'm very proud of my son and anyone who has someone on the spectrum in their family feels the exact same way."

The Yang family lives in a rental apartment in Hell's Kitchen, Manhattan, and also owns a home in New Paltz, New York, that they purchased in 2015. This became the family's primary residence during the early stages of the COVID-19 pandemic, and a focus of controversy during Yang's mayoral campaign. In 2019, Yang reported on his tax return that he rented out this home for 58 days to friends or on Airbnb.

Yang and his family attend the Reformed Church of New Paltz, which is near his home, and has identified Mark E. Mast as their pastor. He considers himself spiritual. Speaking about his faith at an interfaith town hall at Wartburg College, Yang said he "wouldn't be the first to say that [his] own journey is still in progress."

In 2020, Yang received the 2021 Vilcek Prize for Excellence in Public Service, awarded by the Vilcek Foundation.

On February 26, 2021, Yang stopped a physical attack on a journalist on the Staten Island Ferry by placing himself between the attacker and the journalist. The attacker recognized Yang and stopped the assault.

Publications 
 
 
Forward: Notes on the Future of Our Democracy. Penguin Random House. October 5, 2021. ISBN 978-0-593-23865-3.

See also 
 Basic income in the United States
 List of advocates of basic income
 Taiwanese Americans

Notes

References

External links 

 
 
 Official campaign website
  Forward Party website
 

 
1975 births
21st-century American businesspeople
American people of Taiwanese descent
American podcasters
American political commentators
American political party founders
Asian-American people in New York (state) politics
Brown University alumni
Businesspeople from New York City
Businesspeople from Schenectady, New York
Candidates in the 2020 United States presidential election
Candidates in the 2021 United States elections
Centrism in the United States
CNN people
Columbia Law School alumni
Davis Polk & Wardwell lawyers
Lawyers from New York City
Living people
Members of Forward (United States)
New York (state) Democrats
New York (state) Independents
People from Hell's Kitchen, Manhattan
People from Katonah, New York
People from Schenectady, New York
People from Somers, New York
Philanthropists from New York (state)
Phillips Exeter Academy alumni
Reformed Church in America members
Universal basic income activists